Angie Gold (born Angelina Fiorina Kyte)  is a British singer whose song "Eat You Up" was a dance hit in 1985.

Biography 
Born into a musical and artistic Italian family, at the age of eight she was already performing in clubs on weekends. At 17 she did her first TV show.

In 1978, Angie Gold released a single in Germany on Polydor. The title song, "Der schönste Tag" (English translation: "The most beautiful day"), was a previously unreleased adaptation of "If I Had Words".

At the age of 22, she was a contestant on a Saturday night TV show called Search for a Star, where she was spotted by the CBS / Epic Sony record label. After signing a contract with them, she released a Gus Dudgeon-produced single titled "Every Home Should Have One". After another single, she recorded her debut album, which was released in 1982.

Gold's second album, produced by Ben Findon, appeared later in the year. In 1982  from that album she competed at the 11th Tokyo Music Festival (held at the Budokan), winning a "silver" award.

In 1985, she released a song titled "Eat You Up", which reached number 30 on the US Billboard disco chart. A Japanese-language cover of the song, titled "Dancing Hero", was released by Yōko Oginome as her seventh single. The original (published in Japan under the title "Suteki na High Energy Boy") was also popular there, spending four consecutive weeks at the very top of Oricon's International Singles Chart in early 1986.

In 1988, Gold became the new voice of the South-African Hi-NRG band People Like Us and recorded songs including "Resurrection" and "Two to Tango". She also recorded the ballad "Prayer for You", which was originally co-written by Cindy Dickenson.

In late 2007, she reunited with Ian Levine (with whom she worked in the 1980s and 1990s, starting with the 1986 single "Applause" on Passion Records) to record a new song titled "No Pain No Gain" for the various artists album Disco 2008.

As of 2007–2009, she lived in the Canary Islands.

Discography

Albums

Studio albums 
 Angie Gold (1982)
 A Lady of Gold (1982)
 Applause (1986)
 Angie Gold (1988)

Compilation albums 
 The Best of Angie Gold (1995)

Albums with People Like Us 
 People Like Us (1988)

Singles

References

External links 
 Official website (archived)

British pop singers
Year of birth missing (living people)
Date of birth missing (living people)
Place of birth missing (living people)
Living people